John Kennedy Fitzgerald, (born 4 December 1968 in Toronto) is a Canadian former international soccer player. After retiring he became a businessman and corporate lawyer.

Club career
He played for Ontario team Wexford SC from 1987 until 1988, then Toronto Blizzard until 1993.  Whilst pursuing his undergraduate degree in Economics at the University of Toronto, he played for the Toronto Varsity Blues where he won a CIAU championship.

International career
Fitzgerald a right-winger, played for Canada at the 1987 Pan American Games and 1987 FIFA World Youth Championship. He made his senior debut for Canada in a February 1988 friendly match against Bermuda, which was in preparation for Canada's 1990 World Cup qualification campaign. He earned a total of 14 senior caps. Fitzgerald also represented Canadian futsal team at the inaugural 1989 FIFA Futsal World Championship where he scored Canada's goal against Argentina.

His final international game was a May 1990 friendly match against Mexico.

Personal life
In addition to studying Economics at the University of Toronto, Fitzgerald also earned a Bachelors of Law degree from the University of Western Ontario Faculty of Law in 1999. Since graduation, Fitzgerald has practiced corporate and securities law, served as general counsel, business consultant, and executive of various online gaming and cryptocurrency businesses, and has been a private equity investor. Fitzgerald is one of the co-founders of Virgin Gaming.

Since 2019, Fitzgerald has served as president and chief executive officer of Cryptologic Corp, a Canadian-based cryptocurrency mining and software development company.

Fitzgerald is also a season ticket holder with the Toronto Raptors of the NBA.

References

External links
 
 
 Cryptologic management team bio

1968 births
American Professional Soccer League players
Association football wingers
Businesspeople from Toronto
Canadian men's futsal players
Canadian people of Irish descent
Canadian soccer players
Canada men's youth international soccer players
Canada men's international soccer players
Canadian expatriate soccer players
Canadian expatriate sportspeople in England
Canadian Soccer League (1987–1992) players
Canadian expatriate sportspeople in Ireland
Corporate lawyers
Expatriate footballers in England
Footballers at the 1987 Pan American Games
Living people
Pan American Games competitors for Canada
People associated with Bitcoin
Soccer players from Toronto
Toronto Blizzard (1986–1993) players
Toronto Varsity Blues soccer players
University of Toronto alumni
Western Law School alumni
North York Rockets players